Jørn Krogsgaard (born 18 December 1946) is a Danish wrestler. He competed in the men's Greco-Roman 57 kg at the 1972 Summer Olympics.

References

External links
 

1946 births
Living people
Danish male sport wrestlers
Olympic wrestlers of Denmark
Wrestlers at the 1972 Summer Olympics
Sportspeople from Copenhagen